Serigne Fallou Diagne (born 14 August 1989) is a Senegalese professional footballer who plays as a defender for Indian Super League club Chennaiyin.

Club career
Diagne began his career with Génération Foot in Dakar before being scouted by FC Metz in January 2007.

In late August 2014, he joined Stade Rennes from SC Freiburg for a reported transfer fee of €1.5 million signing a three-year contract.

In early July 2016, Diagne signed for Werder Bremen. The transfer fee was estimated at €1.5 to 2 million. On 10 January 2017, Diagne joined Ligue 1 club Metz on loan, rejoining his former club until the end of the 2017–18 season.

In August 2018, Diagne joined Süper Lig side Konyaspor signing a two-year contract with the option of a third year.

International career
Diagne debuted for the Senegal national team in a friendly 2–0 win over Rwanda on 28 May 2016.

Career statistics

Club

International

References

External links
 
 
 
 Diagné Fallou at kicker.de 

Living people
1989 births
Footballers from Dakar
Association football defenders
Senegalese footballers
Senegal international footballers
Senegalese expatriate footballers
FC Metz players
SC Freiburg players
Stade Rennais F.C. players
SV Werder Bremen players
SV Werder Bremen II players
Konyaspor footballers
KF Vllaznia Shkodër players
Ligue 1 players
Ligue 2 players
Bundesliga players
3. Liga players
Senegalese expatriate sportspeople in Germany
Senegalese expatriate sportspeople in France
Senegalese expatriate sportspeople in Turkey
Senegalese expatriate sportspeople in Albania
Expatriate footballers in Germany
Expatriate footballers in France
Expatriate footballers in Turkey
Expatriate footballers in Albania